Dybawka  is a village in the administrative district of Gmina Krasiczyn, within Przemyśl County, Podkarpackie Voivodeship, in southeastern Poland.

Population
The village has a population of 357.

Manufacture
The Przemyśl has "long been famous for manufacturing...elaborately carved wooden and meerschaum pipes and cigar cutters."

References

External links
Sport in Dybawka, Youtube
Dybawka at Youtube
Dybawka Image through Google Earth

Dybawka